City Detective is a half-hour syndicated crime drama starring Rod Cameron as Bart Grant, a tough 1950s New York City police lieutenant.

The show's title was a bit of a misnomer, as Grant fought crime "from Mexico to the Mojave Desert to New York City". 

Herschel Daugherty directed the series, and Lawrence Kimble wrote for it. Blake Edwards was a writer and an associate producer. 

Sixty-five episodes were produced from 1953 to 1955. Revue Productions rented space from Republic Studios for filming the series.

Guest stars

 Mike Connors guest-starred as Massey in the 1955 episode "Baby in the Basket".
 Chuck Connors appeared as Sam in the 1955 episode "Trouble in Toyland".
 Walter Coy appeared as Hilton in "Christmas Pardon" on January 1, 1953.
 Fess Parker appeared as Tony in the 1955 episode "Hearts and Flowers".
 DeForest Kelley appeared twice on City Detective, as Benjamin in "An Old Man's Gold" Kelley and in "Crazy Like a Fox".
 Carolyn Jones appeared twice in the episodes "A Girl's Best Friend" and "On the Record".
 Tom Greenway appeared twice in episodes "Drop Coin Here" (1954), and "Police, Watch My House" (1955).
 Vivi Janiss was cast as Sheila, with Pierre Watkin as Davis, in "The Hypnotic Wife"
 Kim Spalding, as Johnny in "The Rebel" (1953)

 "Man Down, Woman Screaming" featured Beverly Garland, Jack Kelly, Lee Van Cleef, and Frank Ferguson.
 "The Lady in the Beautiful Frame" (Olan Soule and John Doucette)
 "Too Many Grooms" (Claude Akins as Hardy)
 "The Horn That Blew Too Long" (Russ Conway as Clemson)
 "Why Should the Beautiful Die?" (Russell Johnson)
 "The Glass Thumb" (Barbara Billingsley, Frank Ferguson, and Douglas Fowley)
 "Cargo of the Midnight" (Peter Whitney)
 "The Lion Behind You" (Anthony Caruso)
 "On the Record" (Carolyn Jones)
 "Hearts and Flowers" (Eve Miller)
 "The Blonde Orchid" (Hugh Beaumont as Philip Merriam and Douglas Fowley as Detective Wes Harris)
 "Private Mouthpiece" (child actor Richard Eyer as Wester)
 "The Perfect Disguise" (Angie Dickinson)
 "Goodbye Old Paint" (Robert Bray and Vera Miles)
 "Come Back, Little Witness" (Whit Bissell)
 "Found in a Pawnshop" (J. Pat O'Malley)
 "The Beautiful Miss X" (Lynn Bari), the series finale

References

External links
 

1950s American drama television series
1953 American television series debuts
1955 American television series endings
Black-and-white American television shows
Fictional portrayals of the New York City Police Department
First-run syndicated television programs in the United States
Television shows set in New York City
Television series by Universal Television